Lubang Airport is an airport that serves the general area of Lubang Island, located in the province of Occidental Mindoro in the Philippines.  It is the only airport on the island but is one of three airports in the province. The airport is classified as a community airport by the Civil Aviation Authority of the Philippines, a body of the Department of Transportation that is responsible for the operations of not only this airport but also of all other airports in the Philippines except major international airports.

References

External links
 
 

Airports in the Philippines
Buildings and structures in Occidental Mindoro
Transportation in Luzon